William M. Stanley Jr. (born July 21, 1967) is an American politician. A Republican, he was elected in 2011 to the Senate of Virginia for the 20th district. The 20th district includes the cities of Galax and Martinsville, Henry and Patrick counties, part of the city of Danville, and parts of five other Southside Virginia counties.

Early life, education, business career
Stanley was born in Milton, Florida, the son of a United States Navy aviator. The family purchased a home Franklin County, Virginia after his father retired in 1983. Stanley received a B.S. degree from Hampden-Sydney College, and a J.D. from the District of Columbia School of Law. He joined the Northern Virginia law firm of Gilbert Davis, where he was involved in Paula Jones' sexual harassment lawsuit against President Bill Clinton. In 1999 he moved back to Franklin County and began to practice law there.

Political career
Stanley was elected Franklin County Republican Committee chair in 2008, and Virginia's 5th Congressional District Republican Committee chair in 2010.

In 2009, Stanley's home in Franklin County was shifted into the neighboring 20th District of incumbent Democrat Roscoe Reynolds.  Stanley ran in the 20th and defeated Reynolds, 23975 (46.8%)-23331 (45.54%). W. Jeff Evans, the 2007 Republican candidate, ran as an independent, finishing third with 7.58% of the vote.

Notes

External links

1967 births
Hampden–Sydney College alumni
Living people
People from Milton, Florida
People from Franklin County, Virginia
University of the District of Columbia alumni
Virginia lawyers
Republican Party Virginia state senators
21st-century American politicians